Microzada is a genus of moths of the subfamily Chloephorinae and the family Nolidae. The genus was erected by George Hampson in 1912.

Species
 Microzada amabilis (Saalmüller, 1891)
 Microzada anaemica Hampson, 1912
 Microzada similis Berio, 1956
 Microzada subrosea A. E. Prout, 1927
 Microzada vaovao Viette, 1988

References